Mount Nanashiruge is the source of the Kitakami River in Japan, north of Iwate, Iwate.

References 

Mountains of Iwate Prefecture